Datuk Dr. Dominic Lau Hoe Chai (born 18 September 1967) is a Malaysian politician who has served as Senator since November 2021 and 6th President of the Parti Gerakan Rakyat Malaysia (GERAKAN), a component party of the Perikatan Nasional (PN) coalition, since November 2018. He succeeded Mah Siew Keong as party president in November 2018. He was appointed as a Senator to the Dewan Negara in November 2021.

Early life and education 
Lau studied in Phor Tay Primary School, Heng Ee Secondary School and completed his Form 6 in Sek. Abdullah Munshi. Lau was a national swimmer in his youth and represented Penang from 1982 to 1987. During his stint as a swimming athlete, Lau won the championship of the Cross Channel Open Competition in 1986.

Lau graduated with a Bachelor of Science (B.Sc) in Applied Chemistry from Campbell University in 1991. He also received his MSc in Engineering Business Management from the University of Warwick in 1998, and obtained his PhD in Engineering Business Management from University of Technology Malaysia (UTM) in 2002.

Career
After completing his studies in Campbell University in 1991, Lau worked as a quality assurance chemist in the acid manufacturing sector. In 1993, Lau transitioned his career to business management consulting and eventually founded his own consultancy, SQC Consulting Group in 1995. Lau remained active in the sector of business management consulting until his appointment as an associate professor in the Razak School of Engineering and Advanced Technology, Universiti Teknologi Malaysia (UTM) in 2005.

Lau is a certified Blue Ocean Strategy practitioner and was formerly the Director of Applied Research Centre of the Blue Ocean Strategy Regional Centre in UCSI University, and also the Adjunct Professor for the Centre for Postgraduate Studies & Research for Tunku Abdul Rahman University College (TARUC).

In 2013, Lau took a brief break from academia to participate in the 2013 Malaysian General Election. He returned as a Professor in Universiti Teknologi Malaysia (UTM) after the election.

Political career

Candidate for the Batu federal seat in general elections (2013 & 2018) 
Lau contested for the Batu federal seat in Kuala Lumpur in the 2013 and 2018 general elections representing BN and GERAKAN which he lost to Chua Tian Chang from the opposition People's Justice Party (PKR) and Pakatan Rakyat (PR) in 2013 and to independent candidate Prabakaran Parameswaran in 2018 who later joined PKR and Pakatan Harapan (PH).

President of Parti Gerakan Rakyat Malaysia (2018 – present)

Post-GE-14 performance 
On 17 November 2018, Lau was elected as the 6th President of GERAKAN, succeeding Mah Siew Keong who stepped down from party presidency after the 2018 Malaysian general election. GERAKAN later left Barisan Nasional and pivoted their direction towards a political third force. Lau led the party and nominated Wendy Subramaniam as the candidate for the 2019 Tanjung Piai by-election which was held on 16 November 2019. Lau later led the party to participate in the 2021 Melaka state election and the 2022 Johor state election under the Perikatan Nasional banner. Currently, the party has no representation in the Dewan Rakyat and the Dewan Undangan Negeri.

Brief representation in Perak assembly  
The party briefly regained representation in the Perak State Legislative Assembly by accepting Buntong assemblyman Sivasubramaniam Athinarayanan who defected from DAP and PH to the party on 25 June 2020. However, Sivasubramaniam soon left the party for Malaysian United Indigenous Party (BERSATU) on 4 March 2021. Lau expressed his intention to curb party hopping no matter if it is within the same coalition, and told the press that he will bring this issue forward in the Perikatan Nasional Presidential Council.

Joining and supporting Perikatan Nasional 
During the 2020–2022 political crisis, Lau vocally supported the Perikatan Nasional coalition led by the 8th Prime Minister Muhyiddin Yassin before officially joining Perikatan Nasional as a component party in February 2021.  Lau described the support as necessary for the sake of political stability to hasten the recovery of Malaysia from the pandemic.

In August 2021, 15 disgruntled MPs from the Barisan Nasional bench were dissatisfied with the status quo and withdrew their support from the Perikatan government led by Prime Minister Muhyiddin Yassin, toppling the Perikatan government as a result of a lack of parliamentary majority. Ismail Sabri Yaakob from Barisan Nasional was subsequently appointed as the 9th Prime Minister, effectively making Barisan Nasional the government since their electoral defeat in 2018. Although in a leading position, the Barisan Nasional government still requires the backing of Perikatan Nasional to maintain a parliamentary majority. 

Perikatan Nasional continued to support the Barisan government through a confidence and supply agreement despite the loss of the prime minister position. In return, political figures from Perikatan Nasional was appointed as part of the Ismail Sabri Cabinet. Dominic Lau supported the arrangement between Perikatan Nasional and Barisan Nasional as the President of GERAKAN.

Senator (2021–present) 
The Yang di-Pertuan Agong Al-Sultan Abdullah Ri’ayatuddin Al-Mustafa Billah Shah consented to Lau's appointment as a Senator for a 3-year term from 23 November 2021 to 24 November 2024.

Criticisms and clarifications of appointment 
Lau's Senatorial appointment was met with backlash due to its timing shortly after the 2021 Melaka state election. The Democratic Action Party (DAP) was one of the vocal parties voicing out against Lau's appointment over allegations of political compensation. However, Lau dismissed the allegations and clarified the appointment had already been planned way before the election.

Election results

Honours
 :
 Knight Commander of the Order of the Territorial Crown (PMW) – Datuk (2015)

References

1967 births
Living people
Malaysian people of Chinese descent
Parti Gerakan Rakyat Malaysia politicians
People from Penang